Gillingham was a non-metropolitan district in Kent, England. It was abolished on 1 April 1998 and replaced by Medway.

History
The Borough of Gillingham was formed in 1903. In 1928 the adjoining parish of Rainham was added.

In 1944, a Medway Towns Joint Amalgamation Committee was formed by the borough corporations of Chatham, Gillingham and Rochester, to discuss the possibility of the towns forming a single county borough. In 1948 the Local Government Boundary Commission recommended that the area become a "most purposes" county borough, but the recommendation was not carried out.

Political control
From the first election to the council in 1973 until the council's abolition in 1998 political control of the council was held by the following parties:

Leadership
The leaders of the council from 1976 until its abolition in 1998 were:

Council elections
1973 Gillingham Borough Council election
1976 Gillingham Borough Council election
1979 Gillingham Borough Council election (New ward boundaries)
1980 Gillingham Borough Council election
1982 Gillingham Borough Council election
1983 Gillingham Borough Council election (Borough boundary changes took place but the number of seats remained the same)
1984 Gillingham Borough Council election
1986 Gillingham Borough Council election
1987 Gillingham Borough Council election
1988 Gillingham Borough Council election
1990 Gillingham Borough Council election
1991 Gillingham Borough Council election
1992 Gillingham Borough Council election
1994 Gillingham Borough Council election
1995 Gillingham Borough Council election
1996 Gillingham Borough Council election

Borough result maps

By-election results

References

External links

 
Gillingham, Kent
Council elections in Kent
District council elections in England